Joseph Kendrick Cunningham (born May 26, 1982) is an American politician, lawyer and former engineer who served as the U.S. representative for South Carolina's 1st congressional district from 2019 to 2021. The district includes much of South Carolina's share of the Atlantic Coast, from Charleston to Hilton Head Island.

A member of the Democratic Party, Cunningham narrowly defeated Republican state representative Katie Arrington in the 2018 general election. He lost his 2020 re-election bid in another close race to Republican state representative Nancy Mace after one term in Congress.

He was the Democratic nominee in the 2022 South Carolina gubernatorial election and faced incumbent Republican governor Henry McMaster in November but was defeated.

Early life, education and career
Cunningham was born in Caldwell County, Kentucky, and grew up in Kuttawa, Kentucky. He graduated from Lyon County High School in 2000. Cunningham attended the College of Charleston for two years before transferring to Florida Atlantic University in 2002, where he obtained his Bachelor of Science in ocean engineering in 2005.

Cunningham became an ocean engineer with a consulting company in Naples, Florida, and was laid off after about five years. He spent some time learning Spanish in South America, enrolled in law school at Northern Kentucky University's Salmon P. Chase College of Law in 2011, and graduated in 2014. He then worked as a construction attorney for Charleston firm Lyles & Lyles and co-owned the Soul Yoga + Wellness yoga studio with his wife before campaigning for political office. On March 16, 2023, Cunningham announced the launch Cunningham Consulting, a consulting firm specializing in public affairs, government relations and advocacy.

U.S. House of Representatives

Elections

2018 

Cunningham won the nomination, defeating nonprofit consultant Toby Smith, receiving 71.5% of the vote.

Cunningham expected to face Republican incumbent Mark Sanford. However, Sanford was defeated in the Republican primary by state Representative Katie Arrington. Cunningham defeated Arrington with 50.7% of the vote, marking the first time since 1986 that South Carolina Democrats have flipped a U.S. House seat. His victory was widely considered a major upset.

While Arrington carried four of the district's five counties, Cunningham prevailed by winning Charleston County by almost 17,000 votes–more than four times the overall margin of 4,000 votes. Cunningham is the first Democrat to represent the Charleston-based district since 1981. He was also the first white Democrat to win a House seat in the Deep South since John Barrow won reelection in 2012.

2020 

In 2020, Cunningham narrowly lost his seat to Republican state Representative Nancy Mace. Once a solidly Republican district, the 1st district has become competitive in recent elections due to the realignment of Charleston's suburban population to the Democratic Party. However, increased turnout in the heavily conservative Beaufort area undermined this trend, allowing Mace to overcome Cunningham's margin in Charleston County.

Tenure

In his first vote as a U.S. Representative, Cunningham declined to back Nancy Pelosi for Speaker of the House. Cunningham instead voted for Rep. Cheri Bustos of Illinois. Cunningham was a member of the Blue Dog Coalition, a group of Democrats who present themselves as moderate to conservative.

On March 8, 2019, while National Oceanic and Atmospheric Administration assistant administrator for fisheries Chris Oliver was testifying at a Natural Resources Water, Oceans and Wildlife Subcommittee hearing on the effects of seismic testing on right whales, Cunningham blasted an air horn to demonstrate how disruptive commercial air guns were to whales. Cunningham argued that the sound of commercial air guns was up to 16,000 times louder than an air horn.

Cunningham stopped short of endorsing an impeachment inquiry against President Trump after the Ukraine allegations emerged, stating that a partisan rush to impeach the President would be bad for the country, but that if the allegations against Trump were true, they "represent a clear threat to the Constitution, our national security and the democratic process". On October 31, 2019, however, Cunningham voted in favor of a resolution to lay out rules to proceed with an impeachment inquiry of President Trump. On December 16, Cunningham announced that he would support both articles of impeachment pending in the House of Representatives, saying "At the end of day, this is simply about the rule of law, whether we're a country with laws or not and what type of precedent we want to set for future presidents." On December 18, 2019, Cunningham voted for both articles of impeachment against Trump.

In his farewell speech to the House of Representatives in December 2020, Cunningham toasted a can of beer to "the spirit of bipartisanship and cooperation", saying that "for the betterment of this country, we have to come together, we have to sit down and listen to each other, and maybe even have a beer." GovTrack reports that during his two years in the U.S. House, Cunningham joined bipartisan bills the second most often and had the fifth least left-leaning voting record compared to other house Democrats. Nancy Mace, Cunningham's Republican opponent in his 2020 reelection campaign, alleged that Cunningham voted with Democratic Speaker of the House of Representatives Nancy Pelosi 90% of the time.

Committee assignments
Committee on Natural Resources
Subcommittee on Energy and Mineral Resources
Subcommittee on Water, Oceans and Wildlife
Committee on Veterans' Affairs
Subcommittee on Economic Opportunity
Subcommittee on Technology Modernization

Caucus memberships
Blue Dog Coalition
 Future Forum Caucus
 LGBT Equality Caucus
New Democrat Coalition
Problem Solvers Caucus

2022 gubernatorial campaign

 
Cunningham was the Democratic nominee for South Carolina governor, winning the June 14 primary with 57% of the vote. Cunningham was defeated by incumbent Republican governor Henry McMaster in the November election, receiving 41% of the popular vote.

Political positions
Cunningham was voted the 2019 Best Progressive by the Charleston City Paper.

Cunningham supports the Affordable Care Act (Obamacare). Cunningham accepts the scientific consensus on climate change. He also opposes offshore drilling, which garnered him the endorsement of coastal mayors and is attributed for his upset victory, and sponsored bills to ban offshore drilling while serving in Congress. He does not support defunding the police.

He supports legalizing marijuana and sports betting if elected governor of South Carolina.

Personal life 
Cunningham lives in Charleston, South Carolina, with his son Boone. Cunningham is an Eagle Scout. His father, Bill Cunningham, is a former Kentucky Supreme Court Justice and author of historical fiction.

On March 20, 2020, during the COVID-19 pandemic, Cunningham announced that he had tested positive for the virus. In 2021, Cunningham announced his separation from his wife Amanda.

Electoral history

References

External links

 Joe Cunningham for Governor campaign website
 
 

|-

|-

1982 births
Living people
21st-century American politicians
American Protestants
Democratic Party members of the United States House of Representatives from South Carolina
Engineers from Florida
Florida Atlantic University alumni
Kentucky lawyers
Lawyers from Charleston, South Carolina
People from Lyon County, Kentucky
Politicians from Charleston, South Carolina
Salmon P. Chase College of Law alumni